Hadlock is an unincorporated community in Northampton County, Virginia, United States. It is located completely in the town of Exmore. It is located on U.S. Route 13.

References

Unincorporated communities in Virginia
Unincorporated communities in Northampton County, Virginia